Albert Gervais (August 7, 1922 – March 19, 1989) was a politician in Quebec, Canada and a Member of the Legislative Assembly of Quebec (MLA).

Background

He was born in Saint-Casimir, Quebec in the Greater Quebec City Area on August 7, 1922.

Political career

Gervais successfully ran as a Union Nationale candidate in the 1962 election in the provincial district of Montmorency.  He did not run for re-election in the 1966 election.

Death

He died on March 19, 1989.

References

1922 births
1989 deaths
Union Nationale (Quebec) MNAs